Stanley H. Hall (March 9, 1914 - February 14, 1990) was an American football and basketball coach. He served as the head football at Wartburg College in Waverly, Iowa in 1946. Additionally, he served as Wartburg's head men's basketball coach from 1946–47. Hall served as the head men's basketball coach at Bemidji State University from 1948 to 1954 before moving into the same role at the University of Northern Iowa in Cedar Falls, Iowa from 1954 to 1956.

Head coaching record

Football

References

1914 births
1990 deaths
Basketball coaches from Ohio
Bemidji State Beavers men's basketball coaches
Northern Iowa Panthers men's basketball coaches
Northern Iowa Panthers football coaches
Wartburg Knights football coaches
Wartburg Knights men's basketball coaches
People from Guernsey County, Ohio
Players of American football from Ohio